Hanspeter Vogt (born 22 May 1927) was a Swiss speed skater. He competed in the men's 1500 metres event at the 1948 Winter Olympics.

References

External links
 

1927 births
Possibly living people
Swiss male speed skaters
Olympic speed skaters of Switzerland
Speed skaters at the 1948 Winter Olympics
Place of birth missing (living people)